Anthony John Ebert (born 14 February 1947) is a former weightlifter for New Zealand.

He won the gold medal at the 1974 British Commonwealth Games in the men's middleweight. Four years earlier at the 1970 British Commonwealth Games he won the silver medal in the same grade.

He represented New Zealand at the 1972 Summer Olympics finishing 17th in the men's middleweight.

References

1947 births
New Zealand male weightlifters
Olympic weightlifters of New Zealand
Weightlifters at the 1972 Summer Olympics
Commonwealth Games gold medallists for New Zealand
Commonwealth Games silver medallists for New Zealand
Weightlifters at the 1970 British Commonwealth Games
Weightlifters at the 1974 British Commonwealth Games
Weightlifters at the 1978 Commonwealth Games
Living people
Commonwealth Games medallists in weightlifting
20th-century New Zealand people
21st-century New Zealand people
Medallists at the 1970 British Commonwealth Games
Medallists at the 1974 British Commonwealth Games